Amity College, previously called Sule College, is an independent, non-denominational school that is currently operating in three different campuses in , the Illawarra, and .

Description
The main Prestons campus commenced its operation in 1996 with only 33 students; and it now consists of primary, secondary boys’ and secondary girls’ sections. Amity College has been offering a K-12 program at the Main Campus since 2002. The Illawarra campus commenced operation in 1999 with K-2 classes. , the school caters for students from years K-10. The Auburn campus commenced operation in 2001 with K-2 classes. Currently, the school caters for students from years K-12, with a separate girls and boys high school.

Academics 
Amity College was ranked 127th in the Academic School Year of 2017.

Principals 
Amity currently has six principals, five being campus principals and one being the executive principal; 
 Hasan Dagli - Amity College Boys High School Principal 
 Ahmet Cimen - Amity College Auburn Primary Principal 
 Ferhat Gurkhan - Amity College Illawara Principal 
 Nazan Polat - Amity College Prestons Primary Principal 
 Omer Ayvaz - Amity College Girls High School 
 Deniz Erdogan - Executive Principal

Extracurricular activities

Sport 
Sporting activities include:
 Soccer
 Cricket 
 Rugby 
 Basketball
 Chess 
 Oztag 
The school also organises Sports Camps such as a yearly Ski camp, this is offered to high school students.

Volunteer/charity 
Amity College makes contributions to various different charities and all senior students are offered to partake in a project. Furthermore, the school runs various charity events such as the Worlds Greatest Shave, daffodil and harmony day. All the proceeds have been donated to charity organisations.

The current Year 12 Students are now raising funds to open a Health Clinic in Battambang, Cambodia.

Campuses 
  - Illawarra
  - Auburn
  - Prestons

References

External links
 
 
 Amity College Annual Report (9 February 2018) https://web.archive.org/web/20171115195707/http://www.amitycollege.nsw.edu.au/wp-content/uploads/2017/10/AM0070-Annual-Report-2016-WB.pdf
 Amity College Website (9 February 2018) http://www.amity.nsw.edu.au

Private primary schools in New South Wales
Schools in Wollongong
1994 establishments in Australia
Auburn, New South Wales
Private secondary schools in New South Wales
Educational institutions established in 1994